Strata is a puzzle game developed by Minneapolis-based developer Graveck and initially released on September 12, 2013. It was accepted for inclusion on Steam via Steam Greenlight on May 29, 2014.

Gameplay 
Each level has a different grid size, and different types of ribbons. The main goal is to place coloured ribbons down in such a way that the top-most layer of ribbon has matching colors with the square it's placed on.

Critical reception 
, the iOS version of the game has a Metacritic score of 85% based on 8 critic reviews.

References 

2013 video games
Android (operating system) games
IOS games
Linux games
MacOS games
Puzzle video games
Windows games
Windows Phone games